Burning is the fourth album by the group Shooting Star. It was the final album with founding bassist Ron Verlin (who departed the band in 1984) until 1991's It's Not Over.

Track listing

Personnel
Van McLain – guitars, lead vocals
Gary West – lead vocals, guitars, keyboards
Steve Thomas – drums
Ron Verlin – bass
Charles Waltz – violin, keyboards, vocals

References

1983 albums
Shooting Star (band) albums